The Barmen lace machine makes perfect copies of torchon lace and the simpler hand-made bobbin lace. Its bobbins imitate the movements of the bobbins of the hand-made lace maker.

History 
The Barmen machine was developed in the 1890s in the Prussian city of Barmen, now part of Wuppertal, Germany, from a braiding machine. The Barmen laces were derived from solid braids later pieced with openwork.

Design of machine 

The Barmen machine has its spindles arranged in a circle, each one carrying a large bobbin of thread. These can pass each other, so their threads twine together in a complex way. The threads run towards the centre, where the finished lace appears, rising upwards. The machine can only make one width at a time, and has a maximum width of about 120 threads. The lace is made as a cylinder. When finished, threads are removed to allow the flat strip to appear.

Uses 
Barmen machines can make laces, trimmings, elasticated and rigid braids, cords and ric-racs. Barmen lace is still produced in Britain by Malmic Lace Limited, in Nottingham.

References

External links

Woven fabrics
Machine-made lace
Lace-making machinery